Jong Thae-yang is a North Korean diplomat.  He currently serves as the deputy chief of the US Affairs Bureau of the Foreign Ministry.  He has frequently been involved in international talks, including the Six Party Talks.

Jong has worked in various North Korean embassies in other countries, such as Uganda, Namibia.

See also
Foreign relations of North Korea
Politics of North Korea

References 

Living people
North Korean diplomats
Year of birth missing (living people)